Voz Veis was a Venezuelan sextet that released their last studio album "Acústico... Una Noche Común y Sin Corriente" in 2010. They recorded 7 studio albums; the first, Lo Mejor Aún Está Por Venir in 1997. The group had 6 lead singers: Carlos Labrador, Luis Fernando "Luigi" Castillo, Roberto Zambrano, Gustavo González, Santiago Castillo, and Luis Enrique Leal.

After obtaining a contract in 2007 with local Venezuelan newspaper Diario La Verdad to distribute 10,000 copies (the minimum amount required by the Latin Grammy organization) of their album "¿Cómo Se Llega a Belén?", the group succeeded in competing in the 2008 Latin Grammy Awards and consequently won the Best Short Form Music Video for "Ven A Mi Casa Esta Navidad", produced by the Salto Angel Media company and Best Children's Album, becoming the first Venezuelans to earn awards in these categories.

Discography

Studio albums

Lo Mejor Aún Está Por Venir (1997) 
 Razones
 Buenas Nuevas
 Ojalá
 Voz Veis  [Potpurrí]
 Sin Rencor
 Yo Soy Aquel
 Otra Cara Bonita
 Canción
 No Volverá
 A Guaco [Potpurrí]

Virao (2003) 
 Virao
 Pa' Que No Me Puedas Olvidar
 Te Quiero de Colores
 Tanto Swing
 Para Volver a Comenzar
 Y Cómo Haré
 Aunque Sea Poco
 Ya No Estas Aquí
 Respiro
 Yo Sin Ti No Valgo Nada
 Aunque Sea Poco [Acústica]
 Cosita Rica
 Pa' Que No Me Puedas Olvidar [Acústica]
 La Colmena de la Vida

Vas (2004) 
 Vas
 Inexplicable
 El Farolito
 Devuélveme Mi Amor
 Te Brindo
 Cuento Que Te Amo
 Pedacito de Tu Querer
 Di Que Voy a Hacer Contigo
 La Mesera
 Niña Dura
 Tibios Besos
 Esos Ojos Que Me Miran

¿Cómo Se Llega a Belén? (2006) 
 ¿Cómo Se Llega a Belén?
 El Tamborilero
 Gloria
 Ven a Mi Casa Esta Navidad
 Santa Claus Is Coming to Town
 Oíd Un Son
 El Burrito Sabanero
 Noche de Bien
 Esos Ojos Que Me Miran
 Feliz Navidad
 El Burrito Mix

¿Qué Me Has Hecho Tú? (2007) 
 Segundo Plato
 Marta
 Al Otro Lado
 ¿Qué Me Has Hecho Tú?
 Quizás
 Jamás Se Dice Adiós
 Cosita Rica
 Te Enseño a Aterrizar
 Bailamos
 Dame Un Día
 Quiero Ir

Todos a Belén (2008) 
 El Burrito Sabanero featuring Oscar D'León
 ¿Cómo Se Llega a Belén? featuring Franco De Vita
 Gloria featuring Noel Schajris
 Santa Claus Is Coming to Town featuring Mayré Martínez
 Son Tan Buenos los Recuerdos featuring Andrés Cepeda
 El Tamborilero featuring Horacio Blanco
 Ven a Mi Casa Esta Navidad featuring Ricardo Montaner
 Noche de Bien featuring Ilan Chester
 Los Gaiteros featuring Neguito Borjas
 Esos Ojos Que Me Miran featuring Marcos Witt
 Burrito Mix featuring Pipo Ramirez Leo Colina y Oscar D'León

Compilation albums

Éxitos (2006) 

 Aunque Sea Poco
 El Farolito
 Pa' Que No Me Puedas Olvidar
 Inexplicable
 Virao
 Un Pedacito de Tu Querer
 Yo Sin Ti No Valgo Nada
 Vas
 Para Volver a Comenzar
 Devuélveme Mi Amor
 Ya No Estás Aquí
 Cosita Rica
 Niña Dura
 Y Cómo Haré
 Te Brindo
 Di Que Voy a Hacer Contigo
 Cuento Que Te Amo

Grandes Éxitos (2009) 

 Aunque Sea Poco
 Devuélveme Mi Amor
 Virao
 Un Pedacito de Tu Querer
 El Farolito
 Yo Sin Ti No Valgo Nada
 Vas
 Y Cómo Haré
 Segundo Plato
 Cosita Rica
 Te Brindo
 Niña Dura
 Te Enseño a Aterrizar
 Para Volver a Comenzar
 Di Qué Voy a Hacer Contigo
 ¿Qué Me Has Hecho Tú?

Esika y Voz Veis Experience (2010) 

 La Mujer Que Llevas Dentro
 Aunque Sea Poco
 Segundo Plato
 Jamás Se Dice Adiós
 El Farolito
 Tanto Swing
 Niña Dura
 ¿Qué Me Has Hecho Tú?
 Te Enseño a Aterrizar
 Cosita Rica
 Un Pedacito de Tu Querer

Live albums

Acústico: Una Noche Común y Sin Corriente (2009) 
 Niña Dura
 Segundo Plato
 Somos Más
 El Farolito
 Dame Un Día
 Aunque Sea Poco
 Te Brindo
 Ya No Estas Aquí
 Vas
 Amor Secreto
 Un Pedacito de Tu Querer
 The Glory of Love
 Tan Cerca
 Virao

Awards

Latin Grammys
In 2007 at the 8th Annual Latin Grammy Awards, Voz Veis won both Best Latin Children Album, with Cómo Se Llega A Belén, and Best Short Form Music Video, with "Ven A Mi Casa Esta Navidad".

In 2010 at the 11th Annual Latin Grammy Awards, Voz Veis earned its 3rd Grammy after beating music other music artists such as Laura Pausini and Thalia in the "Best Long Form Music Video" for "Una Noche Común y Sin Corriente".

References

External links
Official site

Venezuelan musical groups
Latin Grammy Award winners